St. John the Baptist Church is a parish of the Roman Catholic Church in the Manayunk section of Philadelphia, Pennsylvania. Established in 1831, it is the tenth oldest parish in the Archdiocese of Philadelphia. The current Neo Gothic church was dedicated on April 1, 1894 and is the spiritual home for Roman Catholics living in the Philadelphia neighborhoods of Manayunk, Roxborough, and Wissahickon.

History

Early History of the Parish
The prosperous mill town of Manayunk was the setting for a flood of Irish immigration in the early twentieth century. Lured by the promise of work and freedom in the dark days of the Irish Famine many moved to this location along the Schuylkill River and chose to make their home there.

As the sixth oldest parish founded within the Philadelphia city limits, yet the first parish established outside of Center City, St. John the Baptist was the first location where Catholics who immigrated to the region in the mid-nineteenth century could worship. Jerome Keating was a wealthy mill owner who came to Manayunk with his wife Eulalia, and took up residence in what later became a convent on Cresson Street. The first Catholic Mass in the area was held in the winter of 1829-1830 in the Keatings’ home. Each week, the Keatings would invite a priest to visit and celebrate mass with local Catholics. Eulalia Keating was said to have held a weekly Sunday school for a dozen or so neighboring children. Eventually, when about 20 families or 100 people were celebrating mass at the Keatings’ home, Jerome Keating proposed founding a parish. To that end he made a gift of the ground bordering his home for the construction of a church and an adjoining cemetery. The cornerstone for Saint John’s first Church was laid into place on May 10, 1830 at the site where the upper school stands today. The parish was officially established on April 4, 1831.

With a growing population of the small manufacturing town, the first church of Saint John the Baptist Manayunk became too small. In 188 Bernard McCane bequeathed $100,000 to “Erect and build a church where Saint John the Baptist Church now stands on Rector Street, and to buy and have cast a bell.” The cornerstone for the current church was laid on the northwest corner of the property on September 13, 1886. The church was built at a total cost of $250,000, financed with the help of the local community.

Early Twentieth Century

Middle to Late Twentieth Century

Consolidation of the Parish
In 2012, the Archdiocese of Philadelphia consolidated St. John the Baptist Parish with St. Mary of the Assumption and St. Josaphat Roman Catholic Church in Philadelphia. The St. Josaphat Church property (1898, Cotton Street) is used and maintained as a worship site for the parish, while the St. Mary of the Assumption Church property (1848, Connaroe Street) was sold. The St. Mary church stands although it no longer functions as a worship site. The St. Mary of the Assumption Cemetery on Cinnaminson Street in Roxborough is maintained by the parish.

Physical description
The present church was completed in 1894, with the ensuing clock and bell tower completed in 1906. The church was designed by famed New York architect Patrick Keely and towers over the rowhomes of Manayunk. a)

Much of the church interior was completed in the early 1900s  Many of the sculptures and the Stations of the Cross were crafted by the eminent New York ecclesiastical sculptor Joseph Sibbel, who is said to have worked often with Patrick Keely.

The organ is a 1906 Austin.

In 2015, the parish undertook a $1 million capital campaign to restore the tower and roof of the church.

Parish cemetery
The parish cemetery contains several interments the earliest being in 1829. Numerous Civil War veterans are buried here including Medal of Honor recipient Peter McAdams. Purportedly, the cemetery contains the largest collection of Civil War veterans of any small cemetery in the nation.

References
 Philly Church Project
 Murphy, Eugene (1932) The Parish of St. John the Baptist, Manayunk, Philadelphia: The First One Hundred Years, 1831-1931
 Disney, Desiree; Dennis, Marian (27 January 2014)http://philadelphianeighborhoods.com/2014/01/27/manayunk-changes-in-the-catholic-community/ Philadelphia Neighborhoods. Temple University's Multimedia Urban Reporting Lab. Retrieved October 18, 2015.
Lyons, Reverend James A., Pastor (2006) Saint John the Baptist 175th Anniversary.  Cooke publishing company, Warminster, Pennsylvania.

External links

Roman Catholic churches in Philadelphia
Roman Catholic churches completed in 1906
Religious organizations established in 1831
1831 establishments in Pennsylvania
19th-century Roman Catholic church buildings in the United States